The Fellowship of the British Academy consists of world-leading scholars and researchers in the humanities and social sciences. A varying number of fellows are elected each year in July at the Academy's annual general meeting. Honorary fellows are "expected to have 'contributed signally to the promotion of the purposes for which the Academy was founded', either as persons of academic distinction in other fields whose work has a bearing on the humanities or social sciences; or as leading figures or philanthropists who have themselves done distinguished work in the Academy's fields of interest or promoted or advanced the causes for which the Academy was founded." Up to four may be elected each year.

List 
Names, titles and additional information are formatted as they appear in the cited source(s).

References 
In addition to sources cited below, the main sources used to compile the above list are:
 Proceedings of the British Academy, vol. xviii (1932), pp. vii–xi, for all corresponding fellows elected from Foundation to 1932 inclusive.
 The annual Proceedings of the British Academy (appendix for the annual report; for the years 1933–70).
 The British Academy's Annual Reports (for the years 1971–98).
 "Review July 1998 – July 1999: AGM 1999, The Fellowship", British Academy. As archived at the Internet Archive on 12 December 2000.
 "Review July 1998 – July 1999: AGM 1999, The Fellowship", British Academy. As archived at the Internet Archive on 12 December 2000.
 "Annual elections at the British Academy's AGM", British Academy. 7 July 2000. As archived at the Internet Archive on 6 September 2004.
 "AGM 2001", British Academy. As archived at the Internet Archive on 4 August 2002.
 "Fellows Elected 2002", British Academy. As archived at the Internet Archive on 26 October 2002.
 "Fellows Elected 2003", British Academy. As archived at the Internet Archive on 3 June 2004.
 "Fellows Elected 2004", British Academy. As archived at the Internet Archive on 3 June 2004.
 "Fellows Elected 2005", British Academy. As archived at the Internet Archive on 12 May 2006.
 "Elections to the Fellowship 2006", British Academy. As archived at the Internet Archive on 4 August 2008.
 "Elections to the Fellowship 2007", British Academy. As archived at the Internet Archive on 3 June 2008.
 "Elections to the Fellowship 2008", British Academy. As archived at the Internet Archive on 6 August 2008.
 "Elections to the Fellowship 2009", British Academy. As archived at the Internet Archive on 3 June 2012.
 British Academy Annual Report 2010/11 (London: The British Academy, 2011), p. 47.
 British Academy Annual Report 2011/12 (London: The British Academy, 2012), p. 49.
 British Academy Annual Report 2012/13 (London: The British Academy, 2013), pp. 37–38.
 "British Academy Welcomes 59 New Fellows". British Academy. 18 July 2013. Retrieved 23 October 2016.
 "British Academy New Fellows 2014". British Academy. Retrieved 23 October 2016.</ref><ref>"59 new Fellows welcomed by the British Academy". British Academy. 17 July 2014. Retrieved 23 October 2016.
 "British Academy New Fellows 2015". British Academy. Retrieved 23 October 2016.
 "British Academy announces new President and elects 66 new Fellows", The British Academy, 15 July 2016. Retrieved 18 July 2016.
 "Elections to the British Academy celebrate the diversity of UK research", British Academy, 21 July 2017. Retrieved 22 July 2017.

Footnotes

Further reading 
 "One Hundred Years of Honorary Fellows", British Academy Review, vol. 28 (Summer 2016), pp. 62–63.